Steve Scott is a computer architect who currently serves as Corporate Vice President at Microsoft. Scott was previously a Senior Vice President and Chief Technology Officer at Cray Inc., Principal Engineer at Google  and the chief technology officer for Nvidia's Tesla business unit. Scott was employed by Cray Research, Inc., Silicon Graphics, Inc., and Cray, Inc. from 1992 to 2011 (with a brief hiatus in 2005).

He holds 42 patents. In 2005 Scott received both the ACM Maurice Wilkes Award and the IEEE Seymour Cray Computer Engineering Award.

Scott is a graduate of the University of Wisconsin–Madison, where he received a  B.S. in electrical and computing engineering, an M.S. in computer science, and a Ph.D. in computer architecture. He resides in Seattle, Washington.

Notes 

Living people
American electrical engineers
Computer designers
Cray employees
Businesspeople from Seattle
American chief technology officers
University of Wisconsin–Madison College of Engineering alumni
Year of birth missing (living people)